KELD (1400 kHz, "The Fan") is an AM radio station broadcasting a sports format. Licensed to El Dorado, Arkansas, United States, the station serves the El Dorado area. The station is currently owned by Noalmark Broadcasting Corporation.

References

External links
Noalmark Broadcasting Website

My Father, Rodney P. Smith, was Licensed Operator, Program Director, announcer, and musical performer (piano) for KELD starting in the 1930s and 1940s.  I often accompanied him to turn on the transmitter for broadcasting on many record breaking (no pun intended) adventures- from my pulling and tearing sheets of copy from the AP and UPI machines for his newscasting  to sometimes sing on Uncle Rodney's  Kiddie Program. Maybe I should start jotting notes and continue reporting.

ELD
Sports radio stations in the United States
El Dorado, Arkansas
Radio stations established in 1965
1965 establishments in Arkansas
Noalmark Broadcasting Corporation radio stations